Spectra Shield is a composite material (specifically, an ultra-high-molecular-weight polyethylene (UHMWPE) fiber) used in bulletproof vests and vehicle armour. It is manufactured by Honeywell.

Other popular fibers with similar uses are aramid (Kevlar or Twaron) and Dyneema (another UHMWPE).

References

External links
 Honeywell: Spectra Fiber

Composite materials